Kid Creole Redux is the second compilation album released by American musical group Kid Creole and the Coconuts. It was released in 1992.

Track listing

References

1992 greatest hits albums
Kid Creole and the Coconuts albums
Sire Records compilation albums